The Alfa Romeo 1750 Berlina and Alfa Romeo 2000 Berlina (both 105 series) were executive cars produced by Italian car manufacturer Alfa Romeo from 1968 to 1977. Berlina is the Italian term for a saloon car.
Both cars had Alfa Romeo twin cam inline-four engines; the 1.8-litre 1750 Berlina was made between 1968 and 1971, when it was phased out in favour of the improved 2.0-litre 2000 Berlina.

1750 Berlina
The 1.8-litre engined 1750 series cars were introduced by Alfa Romeo in 1968. The 1750 Berlina four-door notchback saloon was presented to the international press in January 1968 in Vietri sul Mare (Salerno), together with the 1750 GT Veloce coupé and Spider Veloce. Some days later it was displayed at the Brussels Motor Show.

The 1750 Berlina was based on the existing Giulia saloon, which continued in production. The 1750 was meant to top the saloon range, above the 1300 and 1600 cc versions of the Giulia. In the United States, however, the Giulia saloon ceased to be available and was entirely replaced by the 1750 Berlina. The 1750 entered full production in South Africa in early 1969, later complemented by the 2000.

In contrast to the Giulia, the 1750s had reworked bodywork and bigger engine, shared many parts with other concurrent models in the Alfa Romeo range, but sold many fewer units during their production span.

The 1750 bodyshell had a longer wheelbase than the Giulia, and revised external panels, but it shared many of the same internal panels. The windscreen was also the same. The revisions were carried out by Bertone, and while it resembled the Giulia some of that vehicle's distinctive creases were smoothed out, and there were significant changes to the trim details. The car's taillights were later used on the De Tomaso Longchamp.

The car has a 1779 cc twin-carb engine and hydraulic clutch. The 1.8 L engine produced  with two twin sidedraught carburettors. For the US market the 1750 was equipped with SPICA fuel injection. In November 1969 the 1750 received some minor changes, including side blinker lights at front, a wood-rimmed steering wheel, and top-hinged pedals. This model is referred to as the second series.

In 1971, the 1750 Berlina was fitted with an experimental three-speed ZF automatic gearbox. The model designation was 1750A Berlina. According to official Alfa Romeo archives, 252 units were produced with very few surviving to this day. Some of 1750A Berlina didn't have the model plate with production date embossed. The automatic gearbox wasn't well-suited to the four-cylinder motor due to baulky shifting and ill-chosen gear ratio. Because of this, its fuel consumption was frighteningly high and acceleration was a bit  too slow.

During 1971 the 1750 series was superseded across the Alfa Romeo range by the 2000 series; at the top of the saloon line, the 1750 Berlina gave way to the 2000 Berlina. Some 83 final 1750 Berlinas were assembled in 1972. A direct replacement in the 1.8-litre saloon class came that same year, in the form of the all-new Alfa Romeo Alfetta.

2000 Berlina

The Alfa Romeo 2000 Berlina was produced by Alfa Romeo between 1971 and 1977. The engine was bored and stroked out to 1,962 cc. A different grill distinguishes 2000 from 1750. Also, external lights were different between the models. The 1750 had 7 inch diameter outboard headlights, whereas the 2000 had 5 3/4 inch diameter in all four positions. The tail light clusters were also of a simpler design on the 1750. With two carburetors, this 2 litre Alfa Romeo Twin Cam engine produces . Gearbox was 5-speed manual (also 3-speed automatic on some versions).

The federalized spec 2000 Berlina was built from 1972 until 1974, with remaining stock being sold into 1976. For the US, the engine was equipped with mechanical fuel injection and late cars received catalytic converters. Late US-model cars also received safety bumpers made of black rubber with a centre chrome ribbon. 3,395 2000 Berlina were sold in the United States, of which 1,453 reportedly received a catalytic converter.

In 1977 the Alfetta 2000, a two-litre upmarket Alfetta version, replaced the 2000 Berlina. The 2000 Berlina was produced in 89,840 examples, of which 2,200 units were fitted with automatic gearboxes.

Production

Notes

References

External links

Motorbase: Alfa Romeo 1750 Berlina 
Motorbase: Alfa Romeo 1750 GTV 
Motorbase: Alfa Romeo 1750 Spider 
Berlina Register
allcarsmanuals.com: Workshop manuals and technical information

1750
1970s cars
Sports sedans
Executive cars
Rear-wheel-drive vehicles
Cars introduced in 1968